The Rough-headed dragonet (Callionymus limiceps) is a species of dragonet native to the waters off of northern Australia.  This species grows to a length of  TL.

References 

L
Fish described in 1908